Earl Hanley Beshlin (April 28, 1870 – July 12, 1971) was an American lawyer, businessman, and politician who served one term as a Democratic member of the U.S. House of Representatives from Pennsylvania from 1917 to 1919.

Early life and career
Earl H. Beshlin was born in Conewango Township, Pennsylvania. He graduated from Warren High School in Warren, Pennsylvania. He became a lawyer and engaged in private practice. He was elected Burgess of Warren County, Pennsylvania, from 1906 to 1909.  He served as borough solicitor of Warren County from 1914 to 1918.

Congress
Beshlin elected as a Democrat and Prohibitionist to the Sixty-fifth Congress, by special election, to fill the vacancy caused by the resignation of United States Representative Orrin D. Bleakley. Beshlin's Republican opponent in the 1917 special election, Captain Ulysses Grant Lyons, was actually declared the winner erroneously on November 7, 1917, by the New York Times. Beshlin was an unsuccessful candidate for reelection in 1918.

Later career and death
He was a member and later chairman of the Board of Education of Warren County from 1919 to 1935. He was also a hospital executive. 

He died in 1971, at the age of 101, in Warren, Pennsylvania and is interred in Oakland Mausoleum.

Sources

The Political Graveyard

References

1870 births
1971 deaths
Pennsylvania lawyers
American centenarians
Pennsylvania Prohibitionists
Men centenarians
Prohibition Party members of the United States House of Representatives
People from Warren, Pennsylvania
Democratic Party members of the United States House of Representatives from Pennsylvania